Mestinje is a settlement in the  Municipality of Šmarje pri Jelšah in eastern Slovenia. The area is part of the historical Styria region. The municipality is now included in the Savinja Statistical Region. It lies on the crossroads with the regional roads towards Rogaška Slatina and Podčetrtek and on the railway line from Grobelno to Rogatec.

Name
The name of the settlement was changed from Zgornje Mestinje to Mestinje in 1952.

Notable people
Notable people that were born or lived in Mestinje include:
Jakob Sket (1852–1912), writer

References

External links
Mestinje at Geopedia

Populated places in the Municipality of Šmarje pri Jelšah